Tony Dixon may refer to:
 Tony Dixon (Brookside)
 Tony Dixon (DJ) (1958–2010), Irish disc jockey
 Tony Dixon (American football) (born 1979), American football player

See also
 Antonie Dixon (1968–2009), New Zealand murderer
 Anthony Dixon (born 1987), American football player
 Boogie (rapper), real name Anthony Dixson (born 1989), American rapper